Scrobipalpa tereskeni is a moth in the family Gelechiidae. It was described by Mark I. Falkovitsh and Oleksiy V. Bidzilya in 2006. It is found in Uzbekistan.

The larvae feed on Krascheninnikovia ceratoides.

References

Scrobipalpa
Moths described in 2006